Lieutenant General Sir James Melville Babington  (31 July 1854 – 15 June 1936) was a British Army officer and a renowned leader of cavalry, making a name for himself for his actions in the Second Boer War. He was Commander of the New Zealand Defence Force and one of the most respected British generals in the First World War, in command of the 23rd Division. After the war he was Commander of the British Forces in Italy.

General Babington's image was chosen by Paul McCartney and used by the Beatles to depict the fictional "Sgt. Pepper" for the album Sgt. Pepper's Lonely Hearts Club Band in 1967.

Biography
Babington was born in Scotland at Hanley House, Corstorphine, on 31 July 1854 to William Babington (1826–1913) and Augusta Mary Melville (1832–1913), daughter of James Moncrieff Melville, writer to the signet. His ancestors were of the Anglo-Irish branch of the Babington family. He was a cousin to Sir Anthony Babington.

In 1873, Babington was commissioned as a lieutenant in the 16th Lancers, known as the Scarlets. From 1877 to 1880 he was Adjutant of the regiment, the future CIGS William Robertson serving in the ranks under him. In 1884 he accompanied Sir Charles Warren on the Bechuanaland Expedition, where he was "honourably mentioned". From January 1889 to July 1890, Captain Babington was Aide-de-camp to Sir Evelyn Wood when the latter was commanding at Aldershot. This post was both a liberal military education and a marked compliment to the Lancer's ability: Sir Evelyn was known to surround himself with only the most capable of officers. Returning as a major to regimental duty, Babington succeeded to the command of the 16th Lancers in 1892. From 1896 to 1899 he was Assistant Adjutant-General in India. Returning to England he was Staff Commander of the Cavalry Brigade at Aldershot.

During the Second Boer War, Babington commanded the 1st Cavalry Brigade. He took part in the Battle of Magersfontein on 10–11 December 1899, in which the defending Boer force defeated the advancing British forces amongst heavy casualties for the latter. Babington was mentioned in the despatch from Lord Methuen describing the battle. He was regarded as an expert in the management and deployment of  every sort of mounted troop, and he later gained many a decisive victory in South Africa, earning himself a name to be feared among the Boers. He left South Africa in September 1901, returning to England in early October.

From 1902 to 1907, he was in New Zealand as Commander of the New Zealand Defence Force, with the local rank of major general while so employed. He was also appointed honorary Colonel of the 5th Mounted Rifles (Otago Hussars). Returning to England, he was given the command of the Lowland Mounted Brigade from 1908 to 1913 and the Colonelcy of the 16th The Queen's Lancers in 1909, transferring after amalgamation in 1922 to be Colonel of the 16th/5th Lancers (1922 to death).

On the outbreak of the First World War he was given the command of the 23rd Division, part of Kitchener's Army. He was then described as "an elderly but fearless man who was universally popular". Under him, the 23rd became known as "a remarkably hard-fighting and efficient division". He was one of only a few commanding officers who saw to it that his men were properly kitted out, obtaining approval to spend £17,000 on clothing, and sending two officers to the north of England before the Division went overseas to buy 20,000 sets of underclothes and boots. Following the war he was Commander of the British Forces in Italy. He retired with the rank of lieutenant general.

He held the French Croix de guerre with Palm, and the Italian Croce di Guerra. He was a Commander of the Legion of Honour and an Officer of the Military Order of Savoy.

Babington lived at Pinnacle Hill, near Kelso, Roxburghshire, which his family came to through the Maitlands of Penpont. He married Eleanor Lawson (1868–1943), daughter of Thomas James Lawson of Veteran Hall, Prospect, New South Wales. Their son, Geoffrey Babington (1902–1956), married Lady Anne Katherine Granville Scrope Egerton (1908–1964), daughter of John Egerton, 4th Earl of Ellesmere, and sister of the 6th Duke of Sutherland.

References

Books

External links
Portrait of General Babington

|-

1854 births
1936 deaths
British Army lieutenant generals
16th The Queen's Lancers officers
British Army cavalry generals of World War I
British Army personnel of the Second Boer War
British military personnel of the Bechuanaland Expedition
Commandeurs of the Légion d'honneur
Deputy Lieutenants of Roxburghshire
Knights Commander of the Order of St Michael and St George
Knights Commander of the Order of the Bath
Chiefs of Defence Force (New Zealand)
Officers of the Military Order of Savoy
Military personnel from Edinburgh
Recipients of the Croix de Guerre 1914–1918 (France)
Recipients of the War Merit Cross (Italy)
James